Goodbye, Franziska is a 1957 West German romance film directed by Wolfgang Liebeneiner and starring Ruth Leuwerik, Carlos Thompson and Josef Meinrad. It is a remake of the 1941 film of the same name.

It was shot at the Spandau Studios in Berlin. The film's sets were designed by the art directors Gottfried Will and Rolf Zehetbauer.

Cast
 Ruth Leuwerik as Franziska
 Carlos Thompson as Stefan Roloff
 Josef Meinrad as Dr. Leitner
 Friedrich Domin as Professor Thiemann
 Jochen Brockmann as Mr. 'Blacky' White
 Nadja Regin as Helen Philipps
 Gisela Trowe as Gusti
 Siegfried Schürenberg as Harris
 Peter Elsholtz as Anwalt
 Else Ehser as Kathrin

References

Bibliography 
 Parish, James Robert. Film Actors Guide: Western Europe. Scarecrow Press, 1977.

External links 
 

1957 films
West German films
German romance films
1950s romance films
1950s German-language films
Films directed by Wolfgang Liebeneiner
Remakes of German films
Films about journalists
German black-and-white films
Gloria Film films
Films shot at Spandau Studios
1950s German films